Huron-Wendat may refer to:

The Wyandot people who have been called Wendat and Huron
Huron-Wendat Nation, known as the Nation Huronne-Wendat, a First Nation community at Wendake, Quebec
Wendake, Quebec, the current name for the Huron-Wendat reserve
Mantle Site, Wendat (Huron) Ancestral Village, the largest and most complex Wendat-Huron village to be excavated in the Lower Great Lakes
Ratcliff Site, Wendat (Huron) Ancestral Village, a 16th-century Huron-Wendat village approximately 25 kilometers north of Toronto
Aurora Site, Wendat (Huron) Ancestral Village, also known as the "Old Fort," "Old Indian Fort," "Murphy Farm" or "Hill Fort" site, a sixteenth-century Huron-Wendat village approximately 30 kilometres north of Toronto
Draper Site, Wendat (Huron) Ancestral Village, a Precontact period (late fifteenth-century) Huron-Wendat village approximately 35 kilometres north-east of Toronto

See also

 
 Huron (disambiguation)
 Wendat (disambiguation)
 Wyandot (disambiguation)
 Wyandotte (disambiguation)